Maria Sokil (Rudnytsky) (October 18, 1902 – January 20, 1999) was a Ukrainian opera singer.

Sokil was born in the village of Zherebets' (now Tavriiske) in the Zaporizhzhia Oblast on October 18, 1902. She studied at the conservatory in Katerynoslav from 1920 to 1925. She later studied in Italy, France, and Germany.

She made her opera debut in Kharkiv in 1927 in the role of Marguerite in Gounod's opera Faust and  became the prima donna lyric soprano of that opera theater. In 1929, she and bass Ivan Patorzhynsky, representative singer from Ukraine, went on a concert tour to Germany and Italy. Maria remained in Kharkiv until 1930; later, she joined the Kyiv Opera (1930–1932). While in Kharkiv she met  (1902–1975), whom she married in 1931. Rudnytsky was a composer, conductor, and pianist from Lviv, and he had recently been named an orchestra conductor in Kharkiv. Later, in 1932, Maria Sokil performed at the Lviv Opera and Ballet Theater and, with her husband, toured a number of countries in Eastern and Central Europe for the next several years coming with concerts to the United States and Canada in 1937 and then again in 1938–1939 and then remaining in the United States when World War II started.

She had success with the roles of Desdemona (Verdi's Otello), Mimi (Puccini's La Bohème), Liu (Puccini's Turandot), Elsa (Richard Wagner's Lohengrin), Tatiana (Tchaikovsky's Eugene Onegin),  Lisa (Tchaikovsky's The Queen of Spades), Odarka (Hulak-Artemovsky's Zaporozhets za Dunayem), and Natalka (Lysenko's Natalka Poltavka). In 1939, Sokil had the leading role (Odarka) in the motion picture Cossacks in Exile (Zaporozhets za Dunayem), made in the United States. Maria Sokil and her husband subsequently continued their musical activities in several different ways for many years in the United States.

She died on January 20, 1999, in Youngstown, Ohio, at the age of 96.

Children:
 Dorian Rudnytsky (born 1944), cellist and composer
 Roman Rudnytsky (Роман Рудницький) (born 1942), pianist

Grandchildren:
 Tara Palmer (Rudnytsky)
 Evan Rudnytsky
 Oksana McStowe (Rudnytsky)
 Damian Rudnytsky

References

External links
 Obituary in The Ukrainian Weekly, February 7, 1999, No. 6

1902 births
1999 deaths
People from Zaporizhzhia Oblast
American operatic sopranos
Ukrainian operatic sopranos
20th-century Ukrainian women opera singers
20th-century American women opera singers
Ukrainian emigrants to the United States